Y. David Chung (born 1959) is a German-born American contemporary artist, and educator, he is of Korean-descent. He serves as the director of the MFA program at Penny W. Stamps School of Art & Design, associated with the University of Michigan. The focus of his work is Korean identity and various types of diasporas. Chung is known for paintings, drawings, printmaking, art installations, public art, and performances.

Biography
Y. David Chung was born in 1959 in Bonn, Germany. He is of Korean descent, his parents migrated after World War II. His mother was from Kaesong, and his father was from a small town outside Pyŏngyang.

He studied at the University of Virginia, and received his B.F.A. degree from the Corcoran School of the Arts and Design in 1988. He received his M.F.A. degree from George Mason University.

Career 
Chung has been a visiting artists at a number of universities including Duke University, UC Berkeley, Wellesley College, Williams College, and Virginia Commonwealth University. Before returning to school to receive his MFA, Chung was artist-in-residence at Houston-based Project Row Houses in 1996.

After receiving his M.F.A., Chung has held faculty positions at George Mason University and in the Department of Art and Visual Technology and at Penny W. Stamps School of Art & Design at University of Michigan. In 2013, he was a visiting professor at the department of Visual and Environmental Studies at Harvard University.

Artwork
In an article by Rick Lowe for Fresh Talk/Daring Gazes, he discusses Chung's piece Third Ward Jungle and writes that Chung's process in performance work addresses important aspects of integrating art in society. Lowe also comments on the fact that while Chung is the primary performer in his pieces (referring to drawing performances), it is evident that the audience takes on a large role. In addition to his performance based works, Chung has also completed a number of public works.

In 1998, Chung created a large-scale mosaic in P.S. 24 in Brooklyn, New York depicting daily life of Sunset Park that was sponsored by the Board of Education.

Chung's work is in public museum collections including the New Museum, and the Whitney Museum of American Art.

Awards
Chung has received a National Endowment of the Arts Fellowship, the Washington Mayor's Art Award, a Lila Wallace-Reader's Digest Fund Artist at Giverny Fellowship, the Rosebud Best in Show Film and Video Award, the Artslink Collaborative Project Fellowship in Kazakhstan, and the Best Documentary Film Award from the National Film Board of Canada

References

External links
Official website
Stamps.umich.edu

1959 births
Living people
University of Michigan faculty
Corcoran School of the Arts and Design alumni
George Mason University alumni
American people of Korean descent